Anantnag district is a district in the Indian union territory of Jammu and Kashmir. It is one of ten districts which make up the Kashmir Valley. The district headquarters is Anantnag city. As of 2011, it was the third most populous district of Jammu and Kashmir (out of 22), after Jammu and Srinagar.

Administration
At the time of the 2011 census, Anantnag district comprised: Anantnag, Bijbehara, Dooru, Kokernag, Pahalgam, and Shangus tehsils. The district consisted of seven blocks: Breng, Shangus, Achabal, Dachnipora, Qazigund, Khoveripora and Shahabad.

Geography
The district is bordered by Kargil district and Kishtwar district in the east, Doda district and Ramban district to the south and Ganderbal district to the north and Kulgam, Srinagar, Pulwama and Shopian districts to the west.

Climate
Anantnag features a moderate climate (Köppen climate classification. Anantnag's climate is largely defined by its geographic location, with the towering Karakoram to its east and the Pirpanjal range to the south. It can be generally described as cool in the spring and autumn, mild in the summer, and cold in the winter. As a large city with significant differences in Geolocation among various districts, the weather is often cooler in the hilly areas of the east as compared to the flat northern part of Anantnag.

Summer is usually mild and with a little rain, but relative humidity is generally high and the nights are cool. The precipitation occurs throughout the year but no one month is particularly dry. The hottest month is July (mean minimum temperature 6 °C, mean maximum temperature 32 °C) and the coldest are December–January (mean minimum temperature -15 °C, mean maximum temperature 0 °C).

Weather conditions are unpredictable. The record high temperature is 33 °C and the record low is -18 °C. On 5–6 January 2012, after years of relatively little snow, a wave of heavy snow and low temperatures shocked the city covering it in a thick layer of snow and ice, forcing them to officially declare a state of emergency and calling the following two days (6 and 7 January) off for the whole valley.

Anantnag has seen an increase in relative humidity and annual precipitation in the last few years. This is most likely because of the commercial afforestation projects which also includes expanding parks and green cover. The suburb parts of Anantnag are lusher than the central part.
Anantnag District possesses all the typical characteristics of the climate of Kashmir Valley as a whole. "In his introduction to the Rajtarangini Kulan or Kalhána, Pandit says about the climate of Valley: 'It is a country where the sun shines mildly, being the place created by Kashayapa as if for his glory. High school-houses, the saffron, iced water and grapes, which are rare even in heaven, are common here. Kailasa is the best place in the three worlds, Himalaya the best part of Kailásá, and Kashmir the best place in Himalaya.'"

"Sir Walter Lawrence writes in his book The Valley of Kashmir that in latitude Kashmir corresponds with Peshawar, Baghdad and Damascus in Asia: with Fez in Morocco: and South Carolina in America, but it presents none of the characteristics of those countries. People have linked the climate of Kashmir to that of Switzerland until the end of May, and of Southern France in July and August. But it is impossible to speak of Kashmir as possessing any one climate or group of characteristics. Every hundred feet of elevation brings some new phase of climate and of vegetation."

Politics
Anantnag district has 6 assembly constituencies: Anantnag, Dooru, Kokernag, Shangus, Bijbehara and Pahalgam. Anantnag district has one Lok Sabha constituency. The present MP of Anantnag is Hasnain Masoodi of the JKNC. The DDC chairperson of the district is Yousuf Gorsi of JKNC which is part of the PAGD.

Demographics

According to the 2011 census Anantnag district had a population of 1,078,692, roughly equal to the nation of Cyprus or the US state of Rhode Island. This gives it a ranking of 425th in India (out of a total of 640).
Its population growth rate over the decade 2001-2011 was 37.48%. Anantnag had a sex ratio of 927 females for every 1,000 males (this varies with religion) and a literacy rate of 64.32% in 2011.

Anantnag city with population of 108,505 was the largest city in the district. Anantnag Urban Agglomeration had a population of 158,785.

The predominant language of the district is Kashmiri which is spoken by 85.10% of the population. The second largest language is Gujari which is 11.46%, while Pahari is third with 1.21% of the population.

Transportation

Air
The nearest airport is Sheikh ul-Alam International Airport in Srinagar located 60 kilometres from district headquarters Anantnag. There is a nearby airbase in Awantipora which is used by the Indian Air Force.

Rail
Anantnag district is very well-connected with railways. The Jammu–Baramulla line passes through the district. There are numerous railway stations throughout the district.

Road
The district is well-connected with roads and highways. The NH 44, NH 244 and NH 501 passes through Anantnag district alongside other intra-district roads.

Villages
 

 Magri Pora

See also
Pahalgam
Verinag
Kokernag
Sinthan
Qazigund
Kashmir Railway
Martand Sun Temple
Anantnag railway station

Gallery

References

External links

 Official website

 
Districts of Jammu and Kashmir
Minority Concentrated Districts in India